The Luther House is a historic house in Swansea, Massachusetts.  It is a -story gambrel-roofed wood-frame house, five bays wide, with a central chimney and wooden shingle siding.  Its main facade is symmetrically arranged, with a center entrance that has a transom window above.  An ell extends to the right side, and dormers in the roof are a later addition.  The house was built c. 1740, probably by Hezekiah Luther, son of John Luther, the first of that name to settle the area.  It was long associated with the Luthers, a locally prominent family, whose members owned this house until the mid-20th century.

The house was listed on the National Register of Historic Places in 1990.

See also
National Register of Historic Places listings in Bristol County, Massachusetts

References

Houses completed in 1740
Houses in Bristol County, Massachusetts
Swansea, Massachusetts
Houses on the National Register of Historic Places in Bristol County, Massachusetts
1740 establishments in Massachusetts